The France's 1989–1991 nuclear test series was a group of 21 nuclear tests conducted in 1989–1991. These tests followed the 1986–1988 French nuclear tests series and preceded the 1995–1996 French nuclear tests series.

References

French nuclear weapons testing
1989 in France
1990 in French Polynesia
1991 in French Polynesia